Niall McKeever (born 16 February 1989) is a former professional Australian rules football player. He was taken at pick #67 in the 2010 Rookie draft, after having played Gaelic football for the Antrim county team. McKeever made his debut in Round 14, 2011 against .

He was delisted by the Lions following the conclusion of the 2013 season.

Peil Star video
In 2016, McKeever appeared in a street Gaelic football film created by Peil Star with Kieran Hughes (Monaghan), Richie Donnelly (Tyrone) and Ryan McHugh (Donegal). The film was shot at Belfast's Titanic Quarter.

References

External links

1989 births
Living people
VFL/AFL players born outside Australia
Antrim inter-county Gaelic footballers
Brisbane Lions players
Gaelic footballers who switched code
Irish players of Australian rules football
Sportspeople from County Antrim
Expatriate sportspeople from Northern Ireland in Australia